The Sierra Exotic Animal Park is a refuge north of Reno, Nevada, United States. This is not the same zoo that has been at this location in the past. With 42 years of experience at the helm, Sierra Exotic Animal Park is not only a refuge for animals, but a place for education. Home to a wide variety of exotic animals from around the world, including primates, big cats, reptiles, and many, many others. The future of protecting endangered animals lies in educating the public about what Sierra Exotic Animal Park does. Sierra Exotic Animal Park hold all current licensing with USDA, and Nevada Department of Wildlife.

External links

Zoos in Nevada
Buildings and structures in Reno, Nevada
Tourist attractions in Reno, Nevada